Bnz, BNZ, bnz or variant, may refer to:

 Bank of New Zealand (bnz or BNZ)
 BNZ Centre (Wellington), former name of the Aon Centre (Wellington)
 BNZ Building (Christchurch), see List of tallest buildings in Christchurch
 BNZ Tower (Auckland), see List of tallest buildings in Auckland
 Beezen language (ISO 639 language code: bnz)
 Bonza (ICAO airline code: BNZ), see List of airline codes
 Banz Airport (IATA airport code: BNZ), see List of airports by IATA code: B
 Barneveld Zuid railway station (railway code: Bnz)